Square One is an office building in Manchester, England.

History 
The building was formerly occupied by Parcelforce and had a bridge over the adjacent railway line linking it to a parcel depot. In 2002, the office was purchased by Bruntwood. Following a refurbishment, Network Rail moved into the building in 2007. In May 2022, it was sold to High Speed 2 Ltd. It is expected to be demolished to make way for an expansion of Manchester Piccadilly railway station to accommodate HS2 services.

References 

Office buildings in Manchester
High Speed 2
Network Rail